Cuesta abajo may refer to:

Downward Slope (Spanish:Cuesta abajo) is a 1934 American-Argentine musical film directed by Louis J. Gasnier and starring Carlos Gardel
Cuesta abajo, 1995 film with Héctor Anglada
"Cuesta abajo", tango by Gardel